= Market Garden =

Market Garden may refer to:

- Market garden, relatively small-scale production of fruits, vegetables and flowers as cash crops
- Operation Market Garden, a 1944 Allied military operation during World War II in German-occupied Netherlands
